Renaissance of the Resistance is an album by American jazz percussionist Kahil El'Zabar and his Ritual Trio, which also includes saxophonist Ari Brown and bassist Malachi Favors. It was recorded in 1993 and released on Delmark.

Reception

In his review for AllMusic, Alex Henderson states "This CD underscores the fact that not all avant-garde jazz is atonal free jazz; on the whole, this is quite musical and melodic."

The Down Beat review by Larry Birnbaum says "Renaissance of the Resistance redefines the mainstream with wry turns, sly nods, and subtle winks, and its nostalgia extends from Africa to the avant garde."

Track listing
All compositions by Kahil El'Zabar except as indicated
 "Sweet Meat" – 6:16
 "Ornette" – 9:06 
 "Renaissance of the Resistance" – 10:27
 "Trane in Mind" – 8:01
 "Golden Sea" – 7:56
 "Fatsmo" (Ari Brown) – 13:41 
 "Save Your Love for Me" (Buddy Johnson) – 4:37

Personnel
Kahil El'Zabar –  drums, thumb piano, vocal
Ari Brown – saxophones
Malachi Favors – bass

References

1994 albums
Kahil El'Zabar albums
Delmark Records albums